The Knoxville riot of 1919 was a race riot that took place in the American city of Knoxville, Tennessee, on August 30–31, 1919. The riot began when a lynch mob stormed the county jail in search of Maurice Mays, a biracial man who had been accused of murdering a white woman. Unable to find Mays, the rioters looted the jail and fought a pitched gun battle with the residents of a predominantly black neighborhood. The Tennessee National Guard, which at one point fired two machine guns indiscriminately into this neighborhood, eventually dispersed the rioters. At the end of August 1919 the Great Falls Daily Tribune reported four killed in a "race war riot" while the Washington Times reported "Scores dead." Other newspapers placed the death toll at just two, though eyewitness accounts suggest it was much higher.

The Riot of 1919 was one of several violent racial incidents that occurred during the so-called Red Summer when race riots plagued cities across the United States.  The riot was one of the worst racial episodes in Knoxville's history and shattered the city's vision of itself as a racially tolerant Southern town. After the riot, many black residents left Knoxville, and racial violence continued to flare up sporadically in subsequent years.

Background

Post-World War I racial tensions
In the decades following the Civil War, Knoxville was considered by both black and white residents to be one of the few racially tolerant cities in the South. It was one of the few where black citizens could vote, hold public office, and serve as police officers. In 1918, Charles W. Cansler (1871–1953), one of the city's leading African-American citizens, wrote to the governor of Tennessee, "In no place in the world can there be found better relations existing between the races than here in our own county of Knox. No race riots have ever disgraced our city and no mob has ever vented its fury here upon any Negro victim."

During the recession that followed World War I, however, migrants poured into Knoxville, overcrowding the city's slums. This increased competition for an already diminished number of jobs, and heightened tensions between black residents and working class whites. Both the Ku Klux Klan and the National Association for the Advancement of Colored People (NAACP) set up chapters in Knoxville in 1918. Furthermore, in the summer of 1919, a prowler known as "Pants," described by victims as a light-skinned Negro, had been burglarizing homes and attacking white women, though he had attracted little attention from Knoxville police.

Murder of Bertie Lindsey

Around 2:30 AM on August 30, 1919, an intruder broke into the home of Mrs. Bertie Lindsey on Eighth Street, where she had been staying with her cousin, Ora Smyth.  The intruder shot and killed Lindsey, but Smyth managed to escape to the home of a neighbor who summoned police.  Two patrolmen, Jim Smith and Andy White, arrived on the scene. Smyth described the intruder as a light-skinned Negro.

Patrolman White suggested they question Maurice Mays, a prominent mulatto who operated the Stroller's Cafe on East Jackson. While raised by foster parents, Mays is believed to have been the illegitimate son of Knoxville's mayor, John E. McMillan, and had actually been canvassing for McMillan on the day of the murder. Mays had a reputation for associating with both black and white women, making him unpopular with many of the city's white residents. Patrolman Smith later testified that Officer White specifically singled out Mays because of a personal grudge.

At around 3:30 AM, Knoxville police arrived at the Mays home on Humes Street. The only evidence they found was a .38 revolver, which the officers decided must have been fired recently (though Smith later testified the gun was cold and unlikely to have been fired recently). They arrested Mays and took him back to Eighth Street, where the distraught Ora Smyth identified him as the intruder.

Riot

Storming of the jail
Sensing trouble, Knoxville police transferred Mays from the small city jail on Market Square to the larger Knox County Jail on Hill Avenue. Knox County's sheriff, W.T. Cate, then had Mays transferred to Chattanooga. By noon, news of the murder had spread, and a crowd of curious onlookers had gathered at the county jail, thinking Mays was being held there. A larger, angrier crowd had gathered on Market Square. By late afternoon, the crowd at Market Square had grown to about 5,000.

At 5:00 PM, the crowd at the jail became hostile, demanding Mays be brought out. Deputy sheriff Carroll Cate (the sheriff's nephew) and jailer Earl Hall assured them Mays was not there and allowed several members of the crowd to inspect the jail.  Jim Claiborne, an intoxicated member of this crowd, walked to Market Square and told the crowd there that Mays was at the county jail, and that Cate and Hall were hiding him. Jim Dalton, a 72-year-old ironworker, called for Mays to be lynched, and the 5,000-strong mob roared towards the jail.

Unable to convince the mob that Mays was not in their custody, Cate and Hall locked the jail's riot doors. At about 8:30, the rioters dynamited their way into the jail, ransacking it floor by floor in search of Mays. They discovered and consumed a large portion of the jail's confiscated whiskey, and also stole as many firearms as they could find. They freed 16 white prisoners.

Two platoons of the Tennessee National Guard's 4th Infantry, led by Adjutant General Edward Sweeney, arrived, but they were unable to halt the chaos.

Gun battle at Central and Vine
After looting the jail and Sheriff Cate's house, the mob returned to Market Square, where they dispatched five truckloads of rioters to Chattanooga to find Mays. General Sweeney, awaiting the arrival of reinforcements, pleaded with the rioters to disperse. Meanwhile, many of the city's black residents, aware of the race riots that had occurred across the country that summer, had armed themselves, and had barricaded the intersection of Vine and Central to defend their businesses.

As the trucks began to depart, shots rang out on Central, and it was falsely reported that two soldiers had been killed. Sweeney immediately ordered his guardsmen toward Vine, and the mob followed. Along the way, rioters broke into stores on Gay Street to steal firearms and other weapons. As the guardsmen turned onto Vine, the street erupted in gunfire as black snipers exchanged fire with both the rioters and the soldiers. The National Guard set up two Browning machine guns on Vine, and opened fire toward Central. One guardsman, 24-year-old Lieutenant James William Payne, was shot and wounded by a sniper, and as he staggered into the street, he was cut to pieces by friendly fire from the machine guns.

Shooting continued sporadically for several hours. The black defenders charged the machine guns several times but failed to capture them. Among those killed was a black shopkeeper and Spanish–American War veteran named Joe Etter, who was shot when he attempted single-handedly to capture one of the machine guns. Outgunned, the black defenders gradually fled Central and dispersed, allowing the guardsmen to gain control of Vine and Central in the early morning hours of August 31.

The riot's end
The National Guard immediately barricaded Central, and aggressively searched all-black residences inside the barricaded zone. A citywide curfew was imposed, and 200 white citizens were temporarily deputized. Scattered reports of violence persisted throughout the day. Two African American residents, Carter Watkins and Claude Chambers, were shot and killed at a train depot as they tried to flee. A deaf black woman was shot when she failed to heed a guardsman's orders to halt.

Knoxville's newspapers placed the death toll at just two (Etter and Payne), though eyewitness accounts say it was much higher. Deputy Carroll Cate estimated that between 25 and 30 had been killed, while National Guard Major Maurice Martin placed it between 30 and 40. Others placed the death toll in the hundreds. By some accounts, the dead were so many that the bodies were dumped into the Tennessee River, while others were buried in mass graves outside the city.

Aftermath

The rioters and race relations

In the weeks following the riot, many of the city's African-American leaders argued that the rioters did not represent the typical attitude of Knoxville's white citizens, though hundreds of black residents nevertheless left the city for good. Another riot nearly occurred in 1921, and flare-ups would take place sporadically for years afterward.

Knoxville's leaders refused to believe the Riot of 1919 was the result of racial tensions. The Knoxville Journal denied a race riot had occurred, insisting the entire incident was nothing more than the city's "rabble" running amok. Congressman John Chiles Houk argued that the lynch mob would have gone after a white murderer just as eagerly as they had gone after Mays. Fifty-five white rioters were charged with various minor offences in October 1919, but all were acquitted.

The Mays case

Accused killer Maurice Mays was treated more severely. Shortly after his arrest, Mays released a statement denying involvement, declaring that the case against him was one of "oppression and injustice":

"Had the officers been honest in their duties, they would have arrested several suspects filling the description and kept the arrest secret, then they would have allowed the lady to come in a composed condition and pick out the guilty party. As it is, it looks like bad management based on oppression and prejudice. I believe the court will believe me..."

In October 1919, Mays's trial began. Former mayor Samuel Heiskell served as a special prosecutor, while Mays was defended by defense attorney Reuben Cates and prominent black attorney William F. Yardley. Although there was no motive and virtually no evidence, Mays was convicted. The case was eventually overturned by the Tennessee Supreme Court, but Mays was convicted in a retrial in April 1921.

Shortly after 6:00 am on the morning of March 15, 1922, Maurice Mays was led from his cell and strapped to the electric chair at Tennessee State Prison in Nashville. At 6:12 a single jolt of 6,800 volts was sent through his body; he was pronounced dead four minutes later. Mays maintained his innocence of the charges against him to the end, ultimately ascribing his conviction and death sentence to "politics."

In 1926, former mayor John McMillan believed to have been Mays's biological father, committed suicide.

Efforts have been made to clear the name of Mays, but on July 26, 2011, Gov. Bill Haslam said in part, "The Governor is not in a position to grant this request. Decisions such as this are not easy decisions, especially when they involve substituting one's judgment for that of a jury over approximately 90 years later."

See also

 Battle of Depot Street
 Knoxville: Summer of 1915
 List of incidents of civil unrest in the United States

Bibliography 
Notes

References
 - Total pages: 105 

 

 - Total pages: 128 

History of Knoxville, Tennessee
1919 riots in the United States
1919 in Tennessee
Red Summer
African-American history in Knoxville, Tennessee
White American riots in the United States
Riots and civil disorder in Tennessee
Racially motivated violence against African Americans
August 1919 events
History of racism in Tennessee